Sylvirana faber is a species of frog in the family Ranidae. It is found in Cambodia and possibly Thailand.

Its natural habitats are subtropical or tropical moist lowland forests, subtropical or tropical swamps, subtropical or tropical moist montane forests, subtropical or tropical moist shrubland, subtropical or tropical high-altitude grassland, rivers, rural gardens, and heavily degraded former forest.

References

faber
Endemic fauna of Cambodia
Amphibians of Cambodia
Frogs of Asia
Amphibians described in 2002
Taxonomy articles created by Polbot